Thamnocephalus is a genus of fairy shrimp within the family Thamnocephalidae. There are currently 5 species assigned to the genus, along with 2 subgenera.

Species

Subgenus Simplicephalus 

 Thamnocephalus salinarum

Subgenus Thamnocephalus 

 Thamnocephalus chacosaltensis 
 Thamnocephalus mexicanus 
 Thamnocephalus platyurus 
 Thamnocephalus venezuelensis

References 

Anostraca
Branchiopoda genera